|}

The Betfair Hurdle is a Premier Handicap National Hunt hurdle race in Great Britain which is open to horses aged four years or older. It is run at Newbury over a distance of about 2 miles and ½ furlong (2 miles and 69 yards, or 3,282 metres), and during its running there are eight hurdles to be jumped. It is a handicap race, and it is scheduled to take place each year in February.  It currently has a maximum field of 24 runners.

The event was established in 1963, and the inaugural running took place at Aintree. The race was originally sponsored by Schweppes, and it was known as the Schweppes Gold Trophy. Ryan Price won the first two runnings with Rosyth and trained four of the first five winners of the race.  After Rosyth's second win, following four unplaced efforts in between, his jockey was suspended for six weeks and his trainer warned off. More controversy for Price and the Schweppes followed in 1967 when Hill House tested positive for a banned drug.  However it was later shown that Hill House had manufactured his own cortisol.

Schweppes' sponsorship continued until 1986 when it was taken over by Tote Bookmakers (later known as totesport). The race was titled the Tote Gold Trophy from 1987 to 2004, and the totesport Trophy from 2005 to 2011. Since 2012 the race has been sponsored by Betfair and known as the Betfair Hurdle.

Two winners of the race – Persian War and Make a Stand – subsequently achieved victory in the following month's Champion Hurdle. Persian War holds the weight carrying record for the race when winning as a 5 year old in 1968 with 11 stones 13 pounds on his back.

Winners
 Weights given in stones and pounds.

See also
 Horse racing in Great Britain
 List of British National Hunt races
 Recurring sporting events established in 1963  – the Betfair Hurdle is included under its original title, Schweppes Gold Trophy.

References

 Racing Post:

 pedigreequery.com – Totesport Trophy Handicap Hurdle – Newbury.
 sportingchronicle.com – Totesport Trophy Handicap Hurdle.

External links
 Race Recordings 1984–2004 

National Hunt races in Great Britain
Newbury Racecourse
National Hunt hurdle races
1963 establishments in England